The 2016 IFAGG World Cup series in Aesthetic Group Gymnastics is a series of competitions officially organized and promoted by the International Federation of Aesthetic Group Gymnastics.

Formats

Medal winners

World Cup

Challenge Cup

Final ranking

World Cup

Challenge Cup

Note: Only three best results count.

Overall medal table

References

External links
Official Site

Aesthetic Group Gymnastics World Cup
2016 in gymnastics